Paul Roan (born January 11, 1943) is an American politician who served in the Oklahoma House of Representatives from the 20th district from 2000 to 2012.

References

1943 births
Living people
Democratic Party members of the Oklahoma House of Representatives